Alfonso Abellán López (born 21 July 1951) is a Spanish former long-distance runner. He competed in the men's marathon at the 1988 Summer Olympics.

References

External links
 

1951 births
Living people
Athletes (track and field) at the 1988 Summer Olympics
Spanish male long-distance runners
Spanish male marathon runners
Olympic athletes of Spain